Frank is a German surname.  Notable persons with the surname include:

In art
 Alyce Frank (born 1932), American artist
 Jane Frank (1918–1986), American artist
 Jean-Michel Frank (1895–1941), French furniture and interior designer
 Leonard Frank (1870–1944), German-Canadian photographer
 Magda Frank (1914–2010), Hungarian-Argentine sculptor
 Mary Frank (born 1933), American artist
 Robert Frank (1924–2019), American photographer

In music
 Alan Frank (1910–1994), music publisher, clarinetist and composer
 Bob Frank (1944–2019), American musician, singer, and song writer
 Jackson C. Frank (1943–1999), American folk musician

In literature
 Anne Frank (1929–1945), author of a famous diary during World War II
 Edith Frank (1900–1945), mother of Anne Frank
 Margot Frank (1926–1945), sister of Anne Frank
 Otto Frank (1889–1980), father of Anne Frank and posthumous editor of her works
 Bernard Frank (1929–2006), French journalist and writer
 Bruno Frank (1878–1945), German author, poet, dramatist and humanist
 Dan Frank (1954–2021), American editorial director at Pantheon Books
 Leonhard Frank (1882–1961), German writer
 Nathaniel Frank, American author and historian
 Waldo David Frank (1889–1967), American author and scholar
 Thomas Carr Frank (born 1965), American political analyst, historian, and writer

In military
 Bernhard Frank (1913–2011), German SS Commander
 Hans Frank (1900–1946), governor general of Nazi-occupied Poland
 Johann Frank (general) (born 1969) is an officer of the Austrian Armed Forces and political scientist
 Karl Hermann Frank (1898–1946), Sudeten-German Nazi official in Czechoslovakia

In politics
 Barnett Frank (born 1940), known as Barney Frank, American politician, Massachusetts Democratic congressperson
 Donald J. Frank (1937–1995), American politician from Minnesota
 James Frank (born 1966), American politician, Republican member of the Texas House of Representatives from Wichita Falls
 Josip Frank (1844–1911), Croatian lawyer and politician
 Michael Frank (1804–1894), American politician from Wisconsin
 William J. Frank (born 1960), American politician, Maryland Republican state congressperson since 2003

In science
 Adolf Frank (1834–1916), German chemist
 Albert Bernhard Frank (1839–1900), German biologist
 András Frank (born 1949), Hungarian mathematician
 Dawn Frank, American biologist and academic administrator 
 Frederick Charles Frank (1911–1998), British physicist, crystallographer
 Johann Peter Frank (1745–1821), German physician and hygienist
 Ilya Frank (1908–1990), physicist and 1958 Nobel laureate
 Philipp Frank (1884–1966), physicist, mathematician and philosopher

In sports

 John Frank (born 1962), American NFL football player
 Thomas Frank (football manager) (born 1973), Danish football manager 
 Tommy Frank (born 1993), British boxer
 Wolfgang Frank (1951–2013), German footballer and manager

Other
 Andre Gunder Frank (1929–2005), German-American sociologist known as a founder of dependency theory
 Bernard Frank (wilderness activist) (1902–1964), wilderness activist and co-founder of The Wilderness Society
 Eugene Maxwell Frank (1907–2009), American Bishop of the Methodist and United Methodist Churches
 Eve Frank (1754–1816/1817), female Jewish messiah claimant
 Harriet Frank Jr. (1923–2020), American screenwriter and film producer
 Helmar Frank (1933–2013), German mathematician and educator
 Henry Frank (1851–1908), Montana entrepreneur
 Jacob Frank (1726–1791), Polish founder of a Jewish dissident sect
 Jason David Frank (1973–2022), American actor
 Jerome Frank (1889–1957), American legal philosopher
 Leo Frank (1884–1915), man convicted of murdering a 13-year-old girl in Georgia
 Lisa Frank (born 1955), American businesswoman
 Peter Frank (academic) (1934–2013), British professor and media commentator
 Peter Frank (art critic) (born 1950), art critic, curator, and poet
 Ray Frank (1861–1948), female Jewish religious leader
 Robert Frank (1924–2019), photographer
 Robert H. Frank (born 1945), economist
 Semyon Frank, (1877–1950) Russian philosopher
 Thomas Pierson Frank (1881–1951), British civil engineer
 Ulrich Frank (born 1958), German computer scientist

See also 
 Francis (given name)
 Franck (disambiguation)
 Francke 
 Frankau (surname)
 Franke
 Frankel
 Frankl

German-language surnames

sv:Frank#Personer med Frank som efternamn